Cyclolobidae: Goniatitid Ammonoidea belonging to the Cycloloboidea with thickly discoidal to subglobular shells with a small but open umbilicus and ammonitic sutures with numerous lobes that have subparallel sides.
 
The Cyclolobidae is one of three families of the Superfamily Cyclolobaceae; an extinct group of ammonoid cephalopods from the Late Paleozoic

References
 Miller, A.K., Furnish, & Schindewolf. Paleozoic Ammonoidea in the Treatise on Invertebrate Paleontology, Part L, Ammonoidea. Geol Soc of Amererica and Univ of Kansas press; R,C. Moore,(ed).
 The Paleobiology Database 10/01/07

Goniatitida families
Cyclolobaceae